Jagrup Singh (born 15 September 1942) is an Indian wrestler. He competed in the men's freestyle 68 kg at the 1972 Summer Olympics.

References

1942 births
Living people
Indian male sport wrestlers
Olympic wrestlers of India
Wrestlers at the 1972 Summer Olympics
Place of birth missing (living people)
Wrestlers at the 1974 Asian Games
Commonwealth Games medallists in wrestling
Commonwealth Games gold medallists for India
Wrestlers at the 1974 British Commonwealth Games
Asian Games competitors for India
Medallists at the 1974 British Commonwealth Games